Eva Gurrola Ortiz (born 17 May 1994) is a Mexican weightlifter.

She competed at the 2016 Summer Olympics in Rio de Janeiro, in the women's 63 kg.

References

1994 births
Living people
Mexican female weightlifters
Olympic weightlifters of Mexico
Weightlifters at the 2016 Summer Olympics
21st-century Mexican women